Anthony Edward Barton (8 April 1937 – 20 August 1993) was an English footballer, playing as an outside right, and football manager. He was born in Sutton, Surrey and managed Aston Villa to success in the 1982 European Cup, three months after taking charge. He followed this up by beating Barcelona in the 1982 European Super Cup.

Playing career
Tony Barton won England Schoolboy (1 cap) and Youth (5 caps) honours before beginning his football career with Fulham who he joined as a junior. After a spell on loan to Sutton United, he turned professional with Fulham in May 1954. He went on to score 8 times in 49 games for Fulham.

He moved to Nottingham Forest in December 1959 and after never really establishing himself at Forest, making only 22 appearances (scoring once), moved to Portsmouth in December 1961, where he subsequently became player-coach. After retiring as a player, after 130 games and 34 goals for Portsmouth, he remained on the club's coaching staff.

Coaching and managerial career
He subsequently joined the coaching staff at Aston Villa, becoming assistant manager to Ron Saunders in 1980. Villa won the League Championship in 1981 (their first league title in 71 years) and Barton was promoted to the manager's seat in February 1982 after Saunders resigned.

He guided Villa to victory over Bayern Munich in the 1982 European Cup Final and followed this up with the 1982 European Super Cup the following season, but their league form (sixth in 1983 and tenth in 1984) did not match their success in Europe and he was sacked in May 1984.

In July 1984, he took over as manager of Northampton Town but left in April 1985 after suffering a heart attack. In September that year he became assistant manager of Southampton under Chris Nicholl, remaining at The Dell until May 1988. He later became assistant manager of Portsmouth and in February 1991 took over as caretaker manager after the sacking of Frank Burrows.

After leaving Portsmouth he was a talent scout for several clubs.
Shortly before Barton's death he was offered the first manager's job at Wessex League new boys Petersfield Town.

On 20 August 1993, Barton died of a heart attack at the age of 56.

Honours

As a manager 
Aston Villa
European Cup: 1981–82
European Super Cup: 1982

Individual
European Coach of the Season: 1981–82

References

Sources

External links

 

1937 births
1993 deaths
English footballers
English football managers
Fulham F.C. players
Sutton United F.C. players
Nottingham Forest F.C. players
Portsmouth F.C. players
Aston Villa F.C. managers
Northampton Town F.C. managers
UEFA Champions League winning managers
Footballers from Sutton, London
Portsmouth F.C. managers
Association football wingers